Big Shots Bonus EP is a follow-up album to Charizma & Peanut Butter Wolf's Big Shots album. Similar to Big Shots, this album is produced entirely by PB Wolf, however it includes tracks that were not on the former album. This album was released only in vinyl format.

Track listing

External links
Big Shots Bonus EP on Stones Throw
Charizma on Stones Throw
Peanut Butter Wolf on Stones Throw
Stones Throw Records

Peanut Butter Wolf albums
2004 EPs
Stones Throw Records EPs